Dynactin subunit 2 is a protein that in humans is encoded by the DCTN2 gene

Function 

This gene encodes a 50-kD subunit of dynactin, a macromolecular complex consisting of 23 subunits (11 individual proteins ranging in size from 22 to 150 kD). The subunit is commonly referred to as p50 or dynamitin.  Dynactin binds to both microtubules and cytoplasmic dynein. It is involved in a diverse array of cellular functions, including ER-to-Golgi transport, the centripetal movement of lysosomes and endosomes, spindle formation, chromosome movement, nuclear positioning, and axonogenesis. This subunit is present in 4 copies per dynactin molecule.  It contains three short alpha-helical coiled-coil domains that bind to two copies of p150-glued (DCTN1) and two copies of p24 (DCTN3) to form the dynactin shoulder domain.

Interactions 

DCTN2 has been shown to interact with MARCKSL1.

References

Further reading